Zamudio is a Spanish surname. Notable people with the surname include:

Adela Zamudio (1854–1928), Bolivian poet and feminist
Daniel Zamudio (1987–2012), Chilean man murdered in 2012.
Gustavo Zamudio (born 1985), Chilean footballer
Héctor Fix-Zamudio (born 1942), Mexican jurist
Ignacio Zamudio (born 1971), Mexican race walker
José Mario Carrillo Zamudio (born 1956), Mexican football coach
Raúl Zamudio, American art critic